The  is a Japanese order, established on 4 January 1888 by Emperor Meiji as the Order of Meiji. Originally awarded in eight classes (from 8th to 1st, in ascending order of importance), since 2003 it has been awarded in six classes, the lowest two medals being abolished that year. Originally a male-only decoration, the order has been made available to women since 1919.

The Order of the Sacred Treasure, which had 8 ranks until 2003, was awarded as a slightly lower rank than the Order of the Rising Sun for men and the Order of the Precious Crown for women. For example, the 1st class of the Order of the Sacred Treasure has been treated as between the 1st class and the 2nd class of the Order of the Rising Sun and the Order of the Precious Crown, and the 2nd class of the Order of the Sacred Treasure has been treated as between the 2nd class and the 3rd class of the Order of the Rising Sun and the Order of the Precious Crown.

Since 2003, the Order of the Sacred Treasure has been given the same rank as the Order of the Rising Sun. The Order of the Rising Sun is awarded with an emphasis on achievements to the state, and the Order of the Sacred Treasure is awarded with an emphasis on long-term public service. Since military achievements are not included in the criteria for awarding the Order of the Rising Sun, Japan Self-Defense Forces personnel are awarded the Order of the Sacred Treasure for their long service in public service. For example, the Chief of Staff, Joint Staff, the highest rank in the JSDF, receives the Grand Cordon of the Order of the Sacred Treasure (1st class). The Order of the Sacred Treasure is awarded to persons who have been engaged for many years in the public service of the national and local governments, or in the following non-public services that are equivalent to public service, and who have accumulated distinguished service.
 Work directly involved in education or research at school.
 Work directly involved in social welfare at various facilities.
 Work directly involved in medical care or health guidance
 Work commissioned by the national or local governments, such as conciliation commissioners, volunteer probation officers, and welfare commissioners.
 Work that is extremely dangerous.
 Work in an extremely mentally or physically demanding environment.
 Work in an obscure field other than those listed in the preceding items.

Since 2003, the number representing rank included in the official name of the order was removed. As a result, although numbers representing ranks were sometimes used in common names, the formal names such as 勲一等 (Kun-ittō, First Class) and 勲二等 (Kun-nitō, Second Class) were no longer used.

Classes
The Order could be awarded in any of eight classes pre 2003. In 2003 the seventh and eighth classes were dissolved leaving six. Conventionally, a diploma is prepared to accompany the insignia of the order, and in some rare instances, the personal signature of the emperor will have been added.  As an illustration of the wording of the text, a translation of a representative 1929 diploma says:

"By the grace of Heaven, Emperor of Japan, seated on the throne occupied by the same dynasty from time immemorial,

We confer the Second Class of the Imperial Order of Meiji upon Henry Waters Taft, a citizen of the United States of America and a director of the Japan Society of New York, and invest him with the insignia of the same class of the Order of the Double Rays of the Rising Sun, in expression of the good will which we entertain towards him.

"In witness whereof, we have hereunto set our hand and caused the Grand Seal of State to be affixed at the Imperial Palace, Tokyo, this thirteenth day of the fifth month of the fourth year of Shōwa, corresponding to the 2,589th year from the accession to the throne of Emperor Jimmu."

Insignia

The insignia of the order incorporates symbols for the three imperial treasures: the Yata Mirror, so sacred that not even the Emperor is allowed to look at it; the Yasakani Jewel, which is made of the finest jade; and the Emperor's personal sword.

The star for the Grand Cordon and Second Class is similar to the badge as described above, but effectively with two sets of Maltese crosses, one in gilt and one placed diagonally in silver. It is worn on the left chest by the Grand Cordon, on the right chest (without any other insignia) by the 2nd class.

The badge for the first through sixth classes is a Maltese cross, in gilt (1st–4th classes), gilt and silver (5th class) and silver (6th class), with white enameled rays (representing the sword). The central disc is blue, bearing an eight-pointed silver star (representing the mirror), surrounded by a wreath with red-enameled dots (representing the jewel). The badge is suspended on a ribbon, worn as a sash on the right shoulder by the Grand Cordon, as a necklet by males of the 2nd and 3rd classes, on the left chest (the ribbon folded into a triangle) by the 4th to 6th classes (with a rosette for the 4th class). For females of the 2nd to 6th classes, the ribbon is a bow worn on the left shoulder (with a rosette for the 4th class).

Until 2003, when it was abolished, the badge of the seventh and eighth classes was an eight-pointed silver medal, partially gilded for the 7th class, with representations of just the mirror and the jewel. The badge is suspended on a ribbon, worn by men on the left chest (the ribbon folded into a triangle). For women, the ribbon is a bow worn on the left shoulder.

Until 2003, the ribbon of the order was very pale blue with a gold stripe near the borders; since then the ribbon has been light blue, but retains the gold stripe near the borders. When the ribbon is worn alone, the ribbon for the Fourth Class and above incorporates a blue-and-gold rosette (very pale blue until 2003), with a solid gold bar for the Grand Cordon, a gold and silver bar for the Second Class, a solid silver bar for the Third Class and only the rosette for the Fourth Class. The ribbon for the Fifth and Sixth Classes has a centered blue disc (very pale blue until 2003) with gold rays radiating from its center, eight rays for the Fifth Class and six rays for the Sixth Class. Formerly, the ribbon for the Seventh and Eighth Classes had a centered very pale blue disc with gold rays radiating from its center, four rays for the Seventh Class and three rays for the Eighth Class.

After the 2003 reform
In 2003 the lowest two classes of the Order were abolished. Moreover, the badges of the Order will from now on be suspended from three white-enamelled paulownia leaves.

Selected recipients

1st class, Grand Cordon

 Otto Abetz, awarded 1903
 Lt Gen Sir Edward Altham Altham, awarded 1918
 Sir Charles Alexander Anderson, awarded 1921
 James Burrill Angell, awarded 1909
 Isoroku Yamamoto, awarded 1939
 Abdullah Ahmad Badawi, awarded 1981
 Emilio Álvarez Montalván, awarded 2002
 Daniel Boorstin, awarded 1986
 Avery Brundage awarded 1964 
 Cho Tong-yun on 21 April 1905
 Sir Hugh Cortazzi, awarded 1995
 General Sir John Stephen Cowans, awarded 1918
 Takuma Dan, awarded 1932
 Henry Willard Denison 
 Milton Friedman, awarded 1986
 Admiral Albert Gleaves, awarded 1920
 Stephen Gomersall awarded 2015
 Mark Hatfield, awarded 2003
 Chushiro Hayashi, awarded 1994
 Daniel Hays, awarded 2000
 Lt Gen Sir David Henderson, 1918
 James McNaughton Hester, awarded 1981
 Masaru Ibuka (1908–1997) awarded 1978 
 Lt Gen Sir Launcelot Edward Kiggell, 1918 
 General Sir Cecil Frederick Nevil Macready, 1918
 Baron Matsuoka Yasutake, 1902
 Yosuke Matsuoka, 1935 
 Umezawa Michiharu, awarded 1914
 Kōkichi Mikimoto, awarded 1954
 Charles C. Moore, president of the Panama-Pacific Exposition, awarded 1916 
 Akio Morita, awarded 1991
 General Sir Archibald James Murray, 1918
 Lt Gen Sir James Wolfe Murray, 1918
 Nakamura Utaemon VI, awarded 1996
 Norio Ohga, awarded 2001
 Henry Francis Oliver (1865–1965), awarded 1917
 Radhabinod Pal, awarded 1966
 Peter Parker, awarded 1991
 Samuel Kamuela Parker (1853–1920), awarded 1892
 Nancy Pelosi awarded 2015
 Sir Julian Ridsdale (1915–2004), awarded 1967 and 1990
 Eishiro Saito, awarded 1982
 Saisho Atsushi, awarded 1903
 General Sir Henry Crichton Sclater, 1918
 Princess Soamsawali of Thailand
 Shinji Sogo, 'Father of the Bullet Train', awarded 1965
 Kiyoshi Sumiya, awarded 1998
 Shoichiro Toyoda, awarded 1995
 Hugh Trenchard, awarded 1921
 Prof. Pieter van Vollenhoven

2nd class, Gold and Silver Star

 Hirotugu Akaike, awarded 2006
 Momofuku Ando (1910–2007), awarded in 1982
 Herbert W. Armstrong (1892–1986) 
 Hans Hermann Baerwald, awarded 1989 
 Thomas Baty (1869–1954), awarded 1936
 James Molesworth Blair awarded 1921 
 Mary Griggs Burke (1916–2012), awarded 1987
 Pierre Cardin (1922–2020)
 Verner W Clapp (1901-1972), awarded 1968
 Samuel Mills Damon (1845–1924), awarded 1892
 W. Edwards Deming (1900–1993), awarded 1960
 Tomio Fukuoka (2008)
 James Harold Elmsley (1859–1921)
 Bonner Fellers, awarded 1971
 Ted Fujita (1920–1998)
 Fr. Hermann Heuvers S.J., awarded 1969 
 Yoshimasa Hirata (1915–2000), awarded 1987
 William G. Irwin (1843–1914), awarded 1892
 Kaoru Ishikawa (1915–1989)
 Joseph M. Juran (1904–2008) awarded 1981 
 Yuet Keung Kan (1913–2012), awarded 1983
 Shahin Lauritzen, awarded 1999 
 Bernard Leach (1887–1979) 
 Mike Masaoka 1983
 Thomas Corwin Mendenhall, awarded in 1911
 Edward S. Morse (1838–1925), awarded in 1922
 Paul Neumann (Attorney General) (1839–1901), awarded 1892
 Richard W. Pound, awarded 1998
 Johannis de Rijke, awarded 1903
 Sakıp Sabancı (1993–2004), awarded 1992
 Jacob Schiff (1847–1920), awarded 1905
 Charles Nichols Spencer (1837–1893), awarded 1892
 Henry W. Taft (1859–1945)
 Ichimatsu Tanaka (1895–1983)
 Akira Toriyama (1898–1994), awarded 1971
 Wilfred Chomatsu Tsukiyama (1897–1966), awarded in 1963.
 Guy Tripp (1865–1927), awarded 1924
 John Alexander Low Waddell (1854–1938), awarded 1922
 John Smith Walker (1826–1893), awarded 1892
 Langdon Warner (1881–1955), awarded 1955
 William Austin Whiting (1855–1908), awarded 1892
 Merriman Colbert Harris (1846–1921), awarded 1916 
 Hermann Adam Widemann (1822–1899), awarded 1892
 Eugene P. Wilkinson

3rd class, Gold Rays with Neck Ribbon
Thomas Maxwell Hague (1921-2008), awarded 1992
 William DeWitt Alexander (1833–1913), awarded 1892
 John Batchelor D.D., OBE (1855–1944) Archdeacon of an Anglican Communion in Hokkaido awarded in 1933
 Khalid Jerjes, awarded 2017, Consulting Lawyer of the Embassy of Japan in Iraq
 The Rev. Stuart D. B. Picken (1942–2016), awarded 2007
 Frank Shozo Baba (1915–2008) 
 Gheorghe Bagulescu (1886–1963)  
 John Tamatoa Baker (1852–1921), awarded 1892
 Robert Hoapili Baker (c 1845/1847-1900), awarded 1892
 Thomas Baty (1869–1954), awarded 1920
 Henry Franz Bertelmann (1859–1921), awarded 1892
 Captain John P. Brockley USN (born 1942), awarded 1990 Commanding Officer NAF Atsugi
 Delmer Myers Brown (1909–2011), awarded 1997
 George Bull (1929–2001)  
 Clark Burdick (1868–1948), awarded 1918
 Joseph Oliver Carter (1835–1909), awarded 1892
 Edoardo Chiossone (1833–98) 1891
 William Henry Cornwell (1843–1903), awarded 1892
 Dettmar Cramer (1925–2015), awarded September 1971
 Charles F. Creighton (1862–1907), awarded 1892
 Captain John Wallace Curtin Sr. USN (born 1944) awarded August 1994 Commanding Officer NAF Atsugi
 William B. Dazey(1915–2002), awarded 1961
 Sir Frank Gill (1866–1950) awarded 1930
 Robert Günther, awarded 1929
 Günther Gumprich 
 Eleanor Hadley (1916–2007), awarded 1986
 John Adair Hassinger (1837–1902), awarded 1892
 Frank P Hastings, Major, USS Mohican, awarded 1892
 Captain Arthur Hawkins (USN)  
  Col. William F. Hebert (1928–2008), awarded 1970
 Col. Vernon J Henderson (USAF) (1922–2008), awarded 1970 
 Samuel Hill, 1922
 John Dominis Holt II (1861–1916), awarded 1892
 Frederick J. Horne, awarded 1919
 Akira Ifukube (1914–2006) 
 Pieter Philippus Jansen (1902–1982), awarded 11 September 1964
 Paul P. Kanoa (1832–1895), awarded 1892
 Professor Iwane Kimura (1932–2019), Kyoto University, awarded 2012, http://www.kyoto-u.ac.jp/static/en/news_data/h/h1/news7/2012/121103_1.htm
 Miles Wedderburn Lampson (1880–1964), awarded 1932
 Trevor Leggett (1914–2000) 
 Masao Maruyama (1914–1996), awarded 1976
 Genzō Murakami, awarded 1981
 Toshiro Mifune, awarded 1993
 Tetsuya Noda, awarded 2015
 Isamu Noguchi (1904–1988), awarded 1988
 Thomas Noguchi, awarded 1999
 Samuel Nowlein (–1905), awarded 1892
 Keiko Ozato, awarded 2012
 Arthur Porter Peterson (1858–1895), awarded 1892
 Franklin Seaver Pratt (1829–1894), awarded 1892
 John Curtis Perry, awarded 1991.
 Captain Timothy Edwin Prendergast USN (born 1949) awarded August 1997 Commander Fleet Air, Western Pacific
 Leonard Pronko, awarded 1986
 John Keone Likikine Richardson (1853–1917), Private Attorney for Queen Liliuokalani, awarded 1892
 James William Robertson (1852–1919), awarded 1892
 Eric Gascoigne Robinson (1882–1965) 
 Paul Rusch (1897–1979), awarded 1956
 Eiji Sasaki (1915–2007), awarded 29 April 1998
 Munetsugu Satomi (1904–1996), Graphic Designer, awarded December 1974
 William Schull, awarded 1992.
 Tadahiro Sekimoto (1926–2007) 
 Captain Claude B Shaw USN (1918–2012), awarded May 1972 Commanding Officer Fleet Activities Sasebo
 Hiroko Sho, awarded 2006
 William James Smith (1839–1906), awarded 1892
 Sugino Yoshiko, awarded 1978
 Akira Suzuki, awarded 2005
  Col. Fred Grant Swafford (1924–1996), awarded 1972
 Osamu Tezuka (1928–1989), awarded 1989
 Herbert Cyril Thacker (1870–1953) 
 Takeo Uesugi, awarded 2010
 Masanobu Tsuji (1902–1961), awarded 1942
 Bunei Tsunoda (1913–2008)  
 Charles E. Tuttle (1915–1993), awarded 1983
 Elizabeth Gray Vining (1902–1999), awarded 1950
 Gordon Warner (1913–2010), awarded 2001
  The Rt Rev Herbert Welch (1862–1969), awarded 1928
 Charles Burnett Wilson (1850–1926), awarded 1892
 Arthur Young (1907–1979)

4th class, Gold Rays with Rosette

 Mildred Ruth Brown, awarded 1988
 Chōshin Chibana, awarded 1968 
 Charlotte Burgis DeForest (1879–1973), awarded 1950
 Verne Dallas Dusenbery (1885-1978), awarded 1968 
 Ralph D. Dwyer, Jr., awarded 1973
 Keiko Fukuda, awarded 1990
 Masaru Funai, awarded 2001
 The Rev. Jean-Baptist Gaschy (1875–1955), awarded 1954
 John Gillett, awarded 1994
 Beate Sirota Gordon, awarded 1998
 Edbert Ansgar Hewett (1860–1915), awarded 1901
 Noriko Kamakura, awarded 2022
 Herbert Keppler, awarded 2002
 Helmut Laumer, awarded 2002  
 Yukiko Maki (1902–1989), awarded 1976
 Thomas Masuda (1906–1986)  
 Rofū Miki (1889–1964), awarded 1965
 Hidetaka Nishiyama, 2000, awarded 2000
 Agnes Mitsue Niyekawa (1924–2012), awarded 1998
 Junnosuke Ofusa (1908–1994), awarded 1982
 Richard Ponsonby-Fane (1878–1937), awarded 1921
 Oskar Ritter und Edler von Xylander 
 Thomas Tozaburo Sashihara (1900–1974), awarded 15 December 1970
 Shozo Sato, awarded 2004
 Floyd Schmoe, awarded 1988
 Serizawa Keisuke (1895–1984)
 Ir Sukarno (1901–1970)  
 Masao Takahashi, awarded 2002
 Wray Taylor (1853–1910), awarded 1892
 Andrew Tsubaki (1931–2009), awarded 2007
  (1925–2021), awarded 1998
 The Rev. Walter Weston, awarded 1937

5th class, Gold and Silver Rays

 Janak Jeevantha Bandaranayake, awarded in 2020
 Alfred M Burke, awarded 2012
 On Chuil, member of the suite of the Korean Crown Prince, awarded 1908 
 Hester Ferreira, awarded 1997
 Mabel Francis (1880–1975), awarded 1962
 Kumaji Furuya (1899–1977), awarded 1968
 George Edward Luckman Gauntlett (1868–1956) 
 Capt. W.W. Greene, awarded before March 1908 
 Seikan Higa, awarded 1968
 Friedrich Hirzebruch, awarded 1996
 Fujitaro Kubota (1879–1973), awarded 1973 
 Thomas Masuda (1906–1986) 
 John Mittwer (1907–1996), awarded 1977 
 Chiura Obata (1885–1975), awarded 1965
 Azalia Emma Peet (1887–1973), awarded 1953
 Yi Pomik, member of the suite of the Korean Crown Prince, awarded 1908 
 Miki Saito, Japanese Consul General to Hawaii, awarded bef Nov 1905
  Yoshio Senda, Hon. LL.D. (1922–2009), awarded 2008
 Chiune Sugihara (1900–1986), awarded 1944
 Yoshio Tamiya (1905–1988), awarded 1976
 Tetsuo Toyama, awarded 1968

6th class, Silver Rays
 Capt. Philip Going, approx 1905 
 Eijiro Iwamura, 1975
 Chinyei Kinjo, 1968
 Chozaburo Kusumoto, 1906
 Mary Cornwall Legh (1857–1941), awarded 1939
 Capt. Mitsuo Matsumoto (Japanese: 松元三男), (1919-2004), officer of the Japanese Imperial Army, awarded 1944
 Hannah Riddell, (1855–1932) awarded 1924
 Ted Tsukiyama (1920–2019) awarded 2001
 His Majesty Ariki Tuheitia of New Zealand, awarded 2015
 Ko Wichun, member of the suite of the Korean Crown Prince, awarded 1908

7th class: abolished
While established with the original induction of the First 6 classes, Class 7 has never been issued or given an official designation or design.

Officially the Medal and its designation were abolished in 2003; there are no known recipients or issuances of this Medal in its original design from 1887.

8th class: abolished
While established with the original induction of the First 6 classes, Class 8 has never been issued or designated a design, like Class 7 Before it.

Officially the Medal and its designation were abolished in 2003; there are no known recipients or issuances of this Medal in its original design from 1887.

General Class

 Jackson Bailey, awarded 1988
 Carmen Blacker (1924–2009)
 Faubion Bowers
 Ernesto Burzagli (1873–1944), awarded 1906
 Winfield Scott Chaplin (1847–1918), awarded 1882
 George Ramsay Cook, awarded 1994
 David Culver
 Dorothy DeLay
 Mamadou Diarra, awarded 1988 (Order with sunburst) 
 Robert Lawrence Eichelberger 
 Yoshikawa Eiji, awarded 1962
 Anton Geesink
 John Whitney Hall 
 Heinrich Hertz 
 Marcel Junod, awarded 1961
 Takahira Kogoro (1854–1926) 
 Kume Kunitake, awarded 1889
 Tokubei Kuroda (1886–1987), awarded 1939
 Tetsuko Kuroyanagi, awarded 2003
 Toshirō Mifune, awarded 1993 (Order with gold ribbon)
 Lawrence Olson, awarded 1987
 Fusakichi Omori, awarded 1928
 Jean-Jacques Origas, awarded 1998
 John Roderick, awarded 1985
 Renato Ruggiero 
 Jack Seward, awarded 1986
 Edmund Charles Wyldbore Smith (1877–1938)
 Kenjiro Takayanagi, awarded 1989
 Tomoyuki Tanaka, awarded 1981
 Eiji Tsuburaya, awarded 1970
 Yosh Uchida, awarded 1986. 
 Morihei Ueshiba (1883–1969)
 J.R. Wasson (1855–1913), awarded 1874

Gallery

See also
 Order of the British Empire (UK)
 National Order of Merit (France)
 Order of Civil Merit (Spain)
 Order of the Star of Italy
 Order of Service Merit (ROK)
 Decoration of Honour for Services to the Republic of Austria (Grand Decoration in Silver with Sash, in Silver with Star, in Silver, Decoration of Honour in Silver, Decoration of Merit in Silver, Silver Medal)
 Order of Merit (Portugal)

References

Sources
 Peterson, James W., Barry C. Weaver and Michael A. Quigley. (2001). Orders and Medals of Japan and Associated States. San Ramon, California: Orders and Medals Society of America. 
 Rossiter, Johnson, ed. (1904). The Twentieth Century Biographical Dictionary of Notable Americans, Vol. II.  Boston: The Biographical Society....Click link for digitized, full text copy of this book
 Kenkyusha's New Japanese-English Dictionary, Kenkyusha Limited, Tokyo 1991,

External links

 Japan Mint: Production Process

Awards established in 1888
Sacred Treasure, Order of the
1888 establishments in Japan